Vanatinai Island (also called Tagula and Sudest, for the names of the extreme capes of the island) is a volcanic island in the south-east of the Louisiade Archipelago within Milne Bay Province of Papua New Guinea. Tagula town, the main settlement, is located on the north-west coast. The population was 3628 . The principal export is copra.

Geography
A wooded mountain range runs through the length of the island, with the summit, Mount Riu near the center. The most important peaks of the range are, from west to east:
Mount Madau
Mount Gangulua
Mount Riu (formerly called Mount Rattlesnake)
Mount Imau
Mount Arumbi

Climate
Most of Tagula island has a tropical rainforest climate (Af) but the main settlement of Tagula, located in the northernmost and driest part of the island, has a tropical monsoon climate (Am).

History
The first recorded sighting by Europeans of Vanatinai Island was by the Spanish expedition of Luís Vaez de Torres on 14 July 1606.

The island was the site of a gold rush that began in 1888 and peaked in 1889. Gold was found in nearly all of the island's water courses.

Rambuso Village is located on the north coast of the eastern part of the island, where Rambuso Creek flows into the Pacific Ocean. Entry through the reef to the harbour is deep and easy to see during daylight. Many visiting yachts and local trading boats use this protected anchorage. In 2010 the villagers and several visiting yachties rebuilt the wharf and causeway. The villagers new slogan is "Rambuso Creek the gateway to Sudest".
The new wharf helped Rambuso develop and now the busy town has some 500 citizens.

Transportation
The island has an airport, code (IATA-Code „TGL“) for public transport, near Tagula village.

Biodiversity
Several species are endemic to the island, including the aptly named Tagula white-eye, Tagula honeyeater and Tagula butcherbird. Among frogs, Cophixalus tagulensis is only known from Tagula.

References

Islands of Milne Bay Province
Louisiade Archipelago
Gold mines in Papua New Guinea